Neolitsea mollissima is a species of tree in the family Lauraceae. It is known from a single collection; it is endemic to Perak in Peninsular Malaysia.

References

mollissima
Endemic flora of Peninsular Malaysia
Trees of Peninsular Malaysia
Vulnerable plants
Taxonomy articles created by Polbot